is a district located in Kyoto Prefecture, Japan.

As of 2003, the district has an estimated population of 15,493 and a density of 2,595.14 persons per km2. The total area is 5.97 km2.

Towns and villages
Ōyamazaki

Districts in Kyoto Prefecture